Gerhard Schöpfel (19 December 1912 – 17 May 2003) was a German Luftwaffe military aviator and wing commander during World War II. As a fighter ace, he is credited with 45 aerial victories claimed in approximately 700 combat missions, all of which on the Western Front.

Born in Erfurt, Schöpfel grew up in the Weimar Republic and Nazi Germany and joined the German police force. In 1936, he transferred to the Luftwaffe and following flight training was posted to a fighter wing. In September 1939, Schöpfel became a squadron leader in Jagdgeschwader 26 "Schlageter" (JG 26—26th Fighter Wing). Flying with this wing, Schöpfel claimed his first aerial victory on 19 May 1940 during the Battle of France. In August 1941, he was given command of III. Gruppe of JG 26. During the Battle of Britain, he was awarded the Knight's Cross of the Iron Cross on 11 September for 20 aerial victories claimed. In December 1941, Schöpfel was appointed Geschwaderkommodore (wing commander) of JG 26, a position he held until January 1943.

Schöpfel then held various staff positions with Jagdfliegerführer Bretagne, Jagdfliegerführer Sizilien and Jagdfliegerführer Norwegen. In May 1944, he was posted to Jagdgeschwader 54 (JG 54—54th Fighter Wing) and in June was given command of Jagdgeschwader 4 (JG 4—4th Fighter Wing). In April 1945, he was appointed commander of Jagdgeschwader 6 (JG 6—6th Fighter Wing). At the end of the war, he became a Soviet prisoner of war and was released in December 1949. Schöpfel died on 15 May 2003 in Bergisch Gladbach.

Early life and career
Schöpfel was born on 19 December 1912 at Erfurt, at the time in Province of Saxony of the German Empire. Serving with the Landespolizei (state police), he transferred to the Luftwaffe in 1936 and held the rank of Oberfähnrich (officer cadet). Following flight training, Schöpfel was assigned to I. Gruppe (1st group) of Jagdgeschwader 135 (JG 135—135th Fighter Wing). This unit had been formed on 1 April 1937 and was commanded by Major Max Ibel. On 1 November 1938, the Gruppe became the I. Gruppe of Jagdgeschwader 233 (JG 233—233rd Fighter Wing) and was again renamed on 1 May 1939, this time becoming the I. Gruppe of Jagdgeschwader 51 (JG 51—51st Fighter Wing). Initially flying the Heinkel He 51, the unit was reequipped with the Messerschmitt Bf 109 B in November 1937. In 1938, Schöpfel was transferred to the Stab (HQ) flight of I. Gruppe of Jagdgeschwader 334 (JG 334—334th Fighter Wing). This unit was initially commanded by Hauptmann Walter Grabmann and later by Major Gotthard Handrick. This Gruppe also underwent a few name changes. On 1 November 1938, it received the designation I. Gruppe of Jagdgeschwader 132 (JG 132—132nd Fighter Wing) and then again on 1 May 1939 when it was referred to as I. Gruppe of Jagdgeschwader 26 "Schlageter" (JG 26—26th Fighter Wing).

World War II
World War II in Europe began on Friday 1 September 1939 when German forces invaded Poland. Oberleutnant Schöpfel was assigned as commander of 9. Staffel (9th squadron) of JG 26, a squadron of III. Gruppe, on 23 September 1939. He claimed his first aerial victory during the Battle of France on 19 May 1940. In combat with the British Expeditionary Force and Royal Air Force (RAF), 9. Staffel attacked Lille-Marck. Schöpfel claimed a Hawker Hurricane fighter shot down northeast of Courtrai, the claim remained unconfirmed. The opponent may have been Flying Officer Dick Pexton, 615 Squadron. Pexton may have been attacked simultaneously by Schöpfel and Unteroffizier Bernard Eberz. The German pilots claimed a Hurricane each—Pexton was wounded in the legs.

He claimed his first confirmed aerial victory on 29 May during the Battle of Dunkirk. At 18:10, he shot down a Supermarine Spitfire west of Dunkirk. The Spitfire belonged to either No. 64, No. 229 or No. 610 Squadron. Two days later, Schöpfel shot down a No. 609 Squadron Spitfire over Dunkirk. He claimed his last aerial victory of the Battle of France on 2 June in combat with No. 66, No. 266 or No. 611 Squadron Spitfires, claiming his fourth victory in total at 09:25. 

On 6 June, Hauptmann Adolf Galland was appointed Gruppenkommandeur (group commander) of III. Gruppe, replacing Major Ernst Freiherr von Berg. The Armistice of 22 June 1940 ended the Battle of France and III. Gruppe was ordered to Mönchen-Gladbach for a period of maintenance and replenishment. On 21 July, III. Gruppe was moved to an airfield at Caffiers in northern France, close to the English Channel in preparation for the Battle of Britain. Schöpfel claimed his first two aerial victories during the Battle of Britain on 8 August. In a mission to Dover, clearing the airspace ahead of Junkers Ju 87 dive bombers from Luftflotte 3 (Air Fleet 3) attacking Allied convoy Peewit during the Kanalkampf, Schöpfel claimed a No. 600 Squadron Bristol Blenheim bomber and a No. 65 Squadron Spitfire destroyed. The Blenheim crashed into the sea off Ramsgate. Flying Officer D. N. Grice, Sergeant F. J. Keast and A.C.J.B.Q Warren were all killed in action. Schöpfel had originally misidentified the Blenheim and filed the claim over a Handley Page Hampden bomber. On 12 August, one day before Adlertag, he claimed a Spitfire shot down near Folkestone. The downed aircraft belonged to either No. 151 or No. 501 Squadron, but neither squadron operated the Spitfire at this time. No. 151 reported the loss of three Hurricanes, and one pilot, while No. 501 lost two fighters and one pilot killed—the surviving pilot being Squadron leader A. L. Holland. The day after Adlertag, he claimed a Hurricane from either No. 32 or No. 615 Squadron. This claim was not confirmed. 32 Squadron suffered damage to three Hurricanes in force-landings after aerial combat; all pilots unhurt. British sources attribute the loss of two pilots and two Hurricanes from 615 Squadron to Messerschmitt Bf 110s.

On 18 August, Schöpfel fought in the large air battles which characterised the Battle of Britain. Schöpfel led III. Gruppe of JG 26 and Bf 109s from Jagdgeschwader 3, 40 in total, across the Strait of Dover  to sweep the skies clear ahead of the main raid. Some 25 miles behind him were the 27 Do 17s of I. and III./KG 76 escorted by 20 Bf 110s that were to strike RAF Kenley. As the advance led by Schöpfel made their way past the coast it spotted a vic-formation of RAF fighters. They were Hurricanes of 501 Squadron which were conducting wide spirals to gain height. Schöpfel bounced them and claimed four in two minutes killing one pilot and wounding three others. As he departed other members of his Geschwader dived on the Squadron and an inconclusive dogfight ensued. Schöpfel's victims were Donald McKay and Pilot Officers J.W Bland, Pilot Officer Kenneth Lee and F. Kozlowski. Bland was the only one killed. This combat took place over Canterbury in the timeframe 13:55 to 13:56. Lee, who was wounded, bailed out near Whitstable.

Group commander
On 22 August, Galland was appointed Geschwaderkommodore (wing commander) of JG 26 and Schöpfel, who had led 9. Staffel until then, succeeded him as Gruppenkommandeur of III. Gruppe. His successor as Staffelkapitän (squadron leader) of 9. Staffel was Oberleutnant Heinz Ebeling. That day, Galland led the Geschwader in an attack on Manston Airfield. In combat with No. 65 Squadron, Schöpfel claimed a Spitfire shot down at 20:25 CET southeast of Dover. Sergeant M Keymar was killed in a Spitfire over Dover at 19:25 GMT. On 28 August, the Luftwaffe attacked the airfields at Eastchurch and Rochford. In defense of this attack, the RAF dispatched 32 Hurricane fighters and 12 Boulton Paul Defiant interceptor aircraft from No. 264 Squadron. In this encounter, Schöpfel was credited with the destruction of a Defiant shot down east of Canterbury. 264 Squadron suffered the loss of four Defiants and three damaged. Five men (pilots and gunners) were killed and one wounded, Squadron Leader D. G. Garvin was the injured man when L7021 was destroyed. Another solitary claim was made on 31 August but III./JG 26 lost four Bf 109s in combat with 85 and 54 Squadron. One pilot was missing, one rescued, and two were posted in missing in action.

The Blitz bombing campaign during the Battle of Britain began on 7 September 1940. That day, on a mission to London, Schöpfel claimed a No. 603 Squadron shot down at 18:45. During an attack on the London Docks on 9 September, Schöpfel claimed three No. 92 Squadron Spitfires shot down over the Thames Estuary, taking his total to 20 aerial victories claimed. According to British loss lists, 92 Squadron lost only two Spitfires this day; Pilot Officer C. H Saunders was wounded in L1077, and Pilot Officer W. C Watling in P9372. On 11 September, Schöpfel may have shot down a No. 235 Squadron Blenheim bomber on a mission to bomb Calais harbour. That day, he was awarded the Knight's Cross of the Iron Cross for 20 aerial victories claimed, the second pilot of JG 26 to receive this distinction. The Blenheim was in fact escorting Fairey Albacore aircraft. Pilot Officers P. C. Wickings-Smith, A. W. V. Green and Sergeant R. D .H Watts were killed. 

On 29 October, JG 26 targeted the North Weald Airfield. The attack began just as Hurricanes from No. 257 Squadron were taking off. In this encounter, Schöpfel claimed a Hurricane shot down at 17:45, it was observed that the pilot bailed out. Two Hurricanes were hit in the attack. Sergeant A. G. Girdwood burned to death when a bomb exploded next to his Hurricane on take-off. Pilot Officer F. Surma parachuted from P3893 unhurt at an altitude of 3,000 feet. On 1 November, JG 26 escorted Ju 87s in an attack on Alied shipping off the Nore. On this escort mission, Schöpfel claimed a No. 92 Squadron Spitfire shot down over Herne Bay, his last in 1940.

Schöpfel claimed his first aerial victory in 1941 on 17 June. That day, the RAF flew "Circus" No. 14 targeting the Etabs Kuhlmann Chemical Works and power station at Chocques. In total, No. 2 Group sent 23 Blenheim bombers, escorted by fighters from North Weald and Biggin Hill. JG 26 claimed 15 aerial victories including a No. 56 or No. 242 Squadron Hurricane by Schöpfel. Schöpfel claimed two aerial victories on 9 August 1941. Author Thomas assumes that one of the Spitfires was piloted by Flight Lieutenant Lionel Harwood 'Buck' Casson from No. 616 Squadron. On 19 October, III. Gruppe moved to a makeshift airfield at Coquelles, close to Calais on the English Channel. There, they began preparations for operating the then new Focke Wulf Fw 190 A-1. The Gruppe was fully reequipped and operational with the Fw 190 in mid-November 1941.

Wing commander

On 5 December 1941, Galland was appointed General der Jagdflieger (General of Fighters). In consequence of Galland's advance in command responsibility, Schöpfel succeeded him as Geschwaderkommodore of JG 26 on 6 December and Hauptmann Josef Priller became the new Gruppenkommandeur of III. Gruppe. Three days later, he was awarded the German Cross in Gold on 9 December. In December, he was also promoted to Major (major). 

In February 1942 he led III. Gruppe in Operation Donnerkeil. The Channel Dash operation (11–13 February 1942) by the Kriegsmarine was codenamed Operation Cerberus by the Germans. In support of this, the Luftwaffe, formulated an air superiority plan dubbed Operation Donnerkeil for the protection of the three German capital ships. They intercepted Lieutenant Commander Eugene Esmonde, acting as Squadron Leader, No. 825 Squadron Fleet Air Arm, in a Fairey Swordfish. Frail and slow, the Swordfish forced German pilots to lower their undercarriages to prevent overshooting the biplanes. In the event all six Swordfish of this unit were shot down. Several managed to fire off their torpedoes at German ships but none found their mark. Lieutenant Commander Esmonde was shot down and killed by an Fw 190.

Schöpfel claimed an unconfirmed aerial victory over a No. 411 Squadron Spitfire on 24 March. That day, the RAF targeted the Comines power station with "Circus" No. 116. On 14 April 1942, Schöpfel shot down Flight Lieutenant Cyril Wood from No. 403 Squadron. During the Dieppe Raid on 19 August, Schöpfel claimed two aerial victories in the vicinity of Dieppe. He shot down a No. 501 Squadron Spitfire at 16:31 and a No. 222 Squadron Spitfire at 18:30, the last claim by JG 26 of the day.

On 8 November 1942, Anglo–American forces launched Operation Torch (8–16 November 1942), the invasion of French North Africa. In consequence, Schöpfel was ordered to send the 11. (Höhen) Staffel of JG 26, the high altitude squadron equipped with the Bf 109 G, to North Africa. That day, Schöpfel may have claimed two Boeing B-17 Flying Fortress bombers shot down. These claims are attributed to his personal records and cannot be verified by other records. Schöpfel claimed his 45th and last aerial victory on 6 December 1942 over a B-17. That day, the VIII Bomber Command had targeted the steel works at Lille with 66 B-17s. Schöpfel's claim may have been a B-17 from the 305th Bombardment Group. According to Matthews and Foreman, Schöpfel claimed a final B-17 shot down on 20 December. That day, VIII Bomber Command had again targeted Lille. On this raid, six B-17s were lost over France and further 31 aircraft sustained combat damage. According to Caldwell, no claim was filed by Schöpfel.

On 8 January 1943, Schöpfel attended a conference hosted by General der Jagdflieger Galland in Berlin. There, Schöpfel was informed by Galland that on 10 January, he would pass on command of JG 26 to Major Josef Priller and that Schöpfel would be appointed Ia (Operations Officer) with Jagdfliegerführer 2, the fighter controller responsible for protecting the German U-boat bases in France. In a post World War II interview, Galland commented on Schöpfel:

"I knew Schöpfel was not the right man ... He was a nice guy, but not a strong leader ... Priller was better. He was the aggressive type."

Luftwaffe staff positions
Schöpfel left JG 26 on 10 January 1943, with 45 victories, to take up a number of administrative roles. Following his tenure with  Jagdfliegerführer Bretagne, he then went to serve as Fighter Operations Officer for the South Italy Command from July (during the critical Sicily landings) and then Jafü (Fighter Leader) Norway from January 1944.

He returned to a combat command on 1 May 1944, briefly joining the staff of III. Gruppe of Jagdgeschwader 54 (JG 54—54th Fighter Wing) for a month. This was based in Germany on Reich Defense, and he mentored the newly promoted Gruppenkommandeur Siegfried Schnell who had previously commanded 9./JG 2 alongside Schöpfel on the Channel Front. Then, ion 15 June 1944, he was appointed Geschwaderkommodore of the newly formed Jagdgeschwader 4 (JG 4—4th Fighter Wing), taking over command from Major Walther Dahl who was transferred. JG 4 at the time was based at Ansbach. The Geschwader had been formed from Jagdgeschwader z.b.V. as a special purpose unit which was fighting in Defense of the Reich. On 6 August, Schöpfel was shot down in aerial combat with North American P-51 Mustang fighters near Schwerin flying a Bf 109 G-6 (Werknummer 440728—factory number). Forced to bail out, his injuries were serious enough that he had to give up his command on 6 August to Oberstleutnant Gerhard Michalski.

In October 1944 Schöpfel was appointed to the newly created role of Jagdfliegerführer Ungarn (Fighter Leader Hungary). In February 1945 he commanded the Luftkriegsschule 2 (training school) at Gatow. On 10 April he was appointed the final Geschwaderkommodore of Jagdgeschwader 6 (JG 6—6th Fighter Wing) based in northern Czechoslovakia.

After serving on the Eastern Front for approximately one month, Schöpfel was captured by Soviet forces, and was interned for four and a half years in the Soviet Union. He returned to Germany upon his release in December 1949.

Later life
After World War II, Schöpfel worked as a chauffeur and other jobs before obtaining an executive position with Air Lloyd at the Cologne Bonn Airport. He died of natural causes on 17 May 2003 in Bergisch Gladbach-Refrath.

Summary of career

Aerial victory claims
According to Obermaier, Schöpfel was credited with 45 aerial victories, claimed in approximately 700 combat missions. Mathews and Foreman, authors of Luftwaffe Aces: Biographies and Victory Claims, researched the German Federal Archives and found records for 40 aerial victory claims, plus nine further unconfirmed claims, all of which were claimed on the Western Front.

Awards
 Knight's Cross of the Iron Cross on 11 September 1940 as Hauptmann and Gruppenkommandeur of the III./Jagdgeschwader 26 "Schlageter"
 German Cross in Gold on 9 December 1941 as Hauptmann in the III./Jagdgeschwader 26

Notes

References

Citations

Bibliography

 
 
 
 
 
 
 
 
 
 
 
 
 
 
 
 
 
 
 
 
 
 
 
 Spick, Mike (2003).  Luftwaffe Fighter Aces  Greenhill Books. 	
 Spick, Mike (2006).  Aces of the Reich. 	Greenhill Books. 	
 Sundin, Claes & Bergström. Christer (1997).  Luftwaffe Fighter Aircraft in Profile.  Altglen, PA: Schiffer Military History.   including a colour profile of aircraft (#5)
 
 
 
 Weal, John (1999).  Bf109F/G/K Aces of the Western Front''.  Oxford: Osprey Publishing Ltd.	. including a colour profile of aircraft (#24)

People from the Province of Saxony
Military personnel from Erfurt
German World War II flying aces
Recipients of the Gold German Cross
Recipients of the Knight's Cross of the Iron Cross
German prisoners of war in World War II held by the Soviet Union
1912 births
2003 deaths